Spadina–Front GO Station (also referred to as Spadina GO Station) is a planned GO Transit train station to be built by Metrolinx in Toronto, Ontario, Canada, as part of the approved GO Transit Regional Express Rail. It will be situated downtown, south of Front Street between Spadina Avenue and Bathurst Street near office and residential towers. The station will be adjacent to the future Rail Deck Park, an urban park proposed by the City of Toronto. The main station entrance is planned for the intersection of Spadina Avenue and Front Street West.

Spadina–Front is planned to open in 2024 and will be a stop on the GO Transit Barrie line. Despite being located on the corridor, the station is not planned to be a stop on SmartTrack.

By September 2022, Metrolinx had selected developers Dream Unlimited Corp. and Kilmer Group to create a mixed-use development at 433 Front Street West. The  site is currently occupied by the North Bathurst Yard, a GO Transit train layover yard. The new development will be above and connected to the planned GO station.

References

External links
 GO Transit – Environmental Assessments
 CBC – New GO Station announcement

Future GO Transit railway stations
Transport in Toronto
Proposed railway stations in Canada